Yvonne Gancel was a French javelin thrower, who won a silver medal at the 1922 Women's World Games.

References

Date of birth unknown
Date of death unknown
Year of birth unknown
Year of death unknown
French female javelin throwers
Women's World Games medalists
20th-century French women